The Japanese language has two main types of verbs which are referred to as  and  .

Verb groups
Categories are important when conjugating Japanese verbs, since conjugation patterns vary according to the verb's category. For example,  and  belong to different verb categories (godan and ichidan, respectively) and therefore follow different conjugation patterns. Most Japanese verbs are allocated into two categories:

 
 

Statistically, there are far more godan verbs than ichidan verbs.

Terminology
This is best visualized by comparing various verb conjugations to an extracted column of the gojūon table:

In the table above, the verb  uses kana from all 5 rows of the gojūon table in its inflectional suffix—,  and —amongst its conjugations. Thus, it is classified as a "class-5" (or more formally "pentagrade") verb. Meanwhile, the verbs  and  each use kana from only 1 row of the gojūon table in their verb-stem's suffix— and  respectively. Thus, they are classified as a "class-1" (or more formally "monograde") verbs.

Advanced terminology
This is due to  being above  in the  vowel ordering.
In full terminology, the gojūon column name of the verb stem's suffix becomes a prefix of these subgroups.
Godan verbs are also formally classified into subgroups, but instead use the column name of the verb's inflectional suffix. For example, the godan verb  is in the 'ma' column, so it is formally classified as a  verb.

Japanese language education

Within Japanese language education, various terminologies are used in lieu of the Japanese nomenclature for "godan" and "ichidan" verbs.

In literature adopting the "Group I / II / III" terminology, the terms (I), (II) or (III) may be notated beside verbs.
Similarly, (う) or (る) may be notated beside verbs in literature adopting the " / " terminology.

Consonant and vowel nomenclature

The terms "consonant stem verbs" and "vowel stem verbs" come from a pattern that emerges after transliterating verbs into rōmaji. When considering the invariant part of the verb (the verb stem), the final letter determines the classification of the verb group. If the verb stem's final letter:
 is a consonant, then it is a consonant stem verb (godan verb)
 is a vowel, then it is a vowel stem verb (ichidan verb)

There are several flaws with the consonant and vowel nomenclature:
For example,  has the vowel "a" as the invariant suffix, yet it is still categorized as a "consonant stem verb". In these cases, this contradiction is resolved by a technicality where the verb's invariant stem is considered to end in the consonant w. Traditionally these verbs ended in -hu, which is still seen on occasion in historical kana usage, and thus unambiguously ended in h. 
Since the consonant stem terminology focuses on rōmaji, this could lead to conjugation errors. The matter is resolved when phonemic notation of "tu" used by Kunrei-shiki romanization is applied instead. 
This means the defining characteristic of consonant stem verbs cannot be used to define consonant stem verbs for the past-tense or te forms. The true "invariant stem", which is consistent amongst all conjugations, precedes the so-called "invariant consonant".
 This nomenclature is an abstract perspective, since a consonant stem itself never occurs independently; Japanese words are concretely formed with morae, where pairs of consonant and vowel phonemes are indivisible. This means, ironically, that the concepts of "consonant stems" and "vowel stems" are difficult to express in Japanese and seem unnatural to native speakers. 
 Paradoxically, consonant stem verbs conjugate to include all 5 Japanese vowels, whilst the vowel stem verbs are limited to manifesting the same vowel in all conjugates. As such, the consonant stem verb and vowel stem verb terminologies are prone to nomenclature confusion.

Verb classification
Classifying verbs is simple in theory:
 Take the verb in its plain, negative form. The result will be: verb-stem + 
 If the last character of the verb-stem (ignoring the ""):

Dot notation

In some Japanese dictionaries, the readings of conjugable words may have the stem and the inflectional suffix separated by a dot (・).

This system also describes the verb group classification: in godan verbs, the dot is placed before the last kana; in ichidan verbs, the dot is placed before the last 2 kana (except for 2-kana ichidan verbs, which have no dot).

However, regardless of the dot's position, the inflectional suffix is always the last kana of any ichidan verb.

Naive verb classification 
A caveat of accurately classifying verb groups is that you must have pre-existing knowledge of the verb's negative form. In practice, people tend to learn the verb's plain form first. As such, Japanese language educators usually teach strategies for naive verb classification. Whilst such strategies are not comprehensive, they generally remain useful in the context of regular daily conversations that language beginners will likely encounter. Here is one such strategy:

Therefore, when an ichidan verb is concluded from a naive strategy, it is more efficient to confirm the verb's classification in a dictionary. However, there are other rules-of-thumb to more accurately discriminate such verbs.

Rules of thumb
The following heuristics aim to improve the accuracy of naive classification:

 There are far more godan verbs than ichidan verbs.
248 of the 419  verbs [ca. 60%] listed in JMdict are godan verbs.
2886 of the 3013  verbs [ca. 95%] listed in JMdict are ichidan verbs.
Verbs written entirely in hiragana are godan verbs.
Kanji verbs with 1 okurigana and 3+ syllables are godan verbs.
Kanji verbs with 2 okurigana are usually ichidan verbs.
Kanji verbs with 2 syllables are inconclusive.

Godan verbs resembling ichidan verbs
There are many godan verbs which may be mistaken for being ichidan verbs in some cases . On the surface, this may seem like a problem that only affects conjugation patterns, since godan verbs and ichidan verbs conjugate differently . However there are many homophone verbs that, despite sharing the same pronunciation, have different meanings and belong to different verb groups. For example:

When reading homophone verbs such as these, the correct word meaning can be ascertained through the different kanji or through context. In the case of speech, the correct word meaning can still be ascertained because many homophones have different intonations.  However, ambiguity is usually removed if the homophone verbs have been conjugated somehow, because different word groups conjugate with slightly varying pronunciations. For example:

Since there are so many godan verbs that resemble ichidan verbs, it is impractical to create or memorize an exhaustive list of words.

See also
 Japanese verb conjugation
 Honorific speech in Japanese
 Japanese adjectives
 Japanese particles
 Japanese grammar

References

External links
 Archive of the Usenet newsgroup sci.lang.japan forums, a non-exhaustive list of ~iru and ~eru godan verbs
 Aeron Buchanan's Japanese Verb Chart, a concise summary of all Japanese verbs conjugations on one sheet of A4

Godan and ichidan verbs
Japonic verbs